Nikolay Yepifanov (born 10 October 1926) was a Soviet sailor. He competed in the Dragon event at the 1960 Summer Olympics.

References

External links
 

1926 births
Possibly living people
Soviet male sailors (sport)
Olympic sailors of the Soviet Union
Sailors at the 1960 Summer Olympics – Dragon
Sportspeople from Saratov